are a professional football club based in Kashima, Ibaraki, Japan. They currently playing in the J1 League, top tier of Japanese professional football leagues. The club has financial backing from Mercari, a Japanese e-commerce company.

Since the J.League's creation and introduction of professional Japanese football in 1993, Kashima have proven themselves to be by far Japan's most successful football club in terms of trophies won, having won the J.League title a record eight times, the J.League Cup a record six times and the Emperor's Cup five times for an unprecedented nineteen major domestic titles. Kashima became Asian champions for the first and most recent time as they won the AFC Champions League in 2018.

Kashima are also one of only two clubs to have competed in Japan's professional top-flight football every year since its inception (the other being Yokohama F. Marinos).

Name origin
The name Antlers is derived from the city name, Kashima, which literally means "deer island".

History
The name 'Antlers' is derived from the city of Kashima (鹿嶋), which literally translates to 'Deer Island'. The club crest not only resembles deer antlers but it also reflects the image of rose thorn as it is the official flower of Ibaraki, the home prefecture of the club. Deer are amiable animals and are viewed in some religions as spiritual messengers. In fact, Kashima Shrine, one of the most famous shrines in Japan and located in close proximity to the club headquarters, have kept and raised deer for more than 1,300 years as spiritual symbol. Deer are affectionate animals but are also known for their courageous character as they battle each other head-to-head with lethal antlers.

Founded in 1947 as Sumitomo Metal Industries Factory Football Club in Osaka and moved to Kashima, Ibaraki in 1975. It played in the semi-professional Japan Soccer League (JSL). They were promoted to the JSL's top flight in 1984, but never made much of an impact, going down in 1985/86, returning in 1986/87 and going down again in 1988/89. Its last standing in the JSL was 2nd in the Second Division for 1991/92.

After the formation of the fully professional J.League, Sumitomo, like all other clubs, stripped the corporate brand from the club's name and reformed as the Kashima Antlers. Kashima was essentially promoted to the new top flight, as many JSL First Division clubs decided to relegate themselves being unprepared for professionalism. (Of the original 10 J.League founding member clubs, Kashima and Shimizu S-Pulse were newly promoted. Ironically, Kashima had defeated a forerunner of Shimizu's, Nippon Light Metal/Hagoromo Club, to earn its JSL Second Division place back in 1974).

Since the J.League's creation and introduction of professional Japanese football in 1993, Kashima have consistently been amongst the strongest clubs in the country, holding several distinctions and records. Led by former Brazilian star and Japanese national team coach Zico in the club's formative years, Kashima were the first club to win a J.League stage, claiming the 1st stage of the inaugural season in 1993. This laid a platform for continuous greatness and long after the Kashima icon had departed, in 2000 Kashima became the first J.League club to achieve the "treble", by winning all three major titles: J.League, J.League Cup, and Emperor's Cup in the same year.

In recent times, by clinching the 2007 J.League title they became the first and only club in Japan to have won ten domestic titles in the professional era. In 2008 they became the first and only club to successfully defend the J.League title on two occasions. In 2009 they became the first and only club to win three consecutive J.League titles. With victories in back to back J.League Cups in 2011, 2012 and most recently followed by their 2015 victory, Kashima extended their unmatched record of major domestic titles in the professional era to seventeen.

To this day, Kashima has maintained strong ties with the football community in Brazil, a fact borne out of Zico's past affiliation with the club. Kashima's Brazilian connection has manifested itself in both the club's player transfer and coaching policy resulting in only three non-Brazilian foreign players and predominantly Brazilian managers signing for Kashima since the inception of the J.League.

The population of Kashima city is a mere 60,000 and for that reason club has also adopted the surrounding cities of Itako, Kamisu, Namegata and Hokota as its official hometowns, all in Ibaraki Prefecture. The combined population of five cities is 280,000. Antlers home games are played at Kashima Soccer Stadium, one of the 2002 FIFA World Cup venues with capacity of 40,000.

In 2016, they became the first Asian club to reach the FIFA Club World Cup final following a 3–0 victory over South American champions Atlético Nacional. In the final, after a 2–2 draw against European champions Real Madrid after 90 minutes, they were beaten 4–2 after extra time.

Colour, sponsors and manufacturers

Kit evolution

Slogans

Players

Current squad

.Out on loan

 Reserve squad (U-18s) 
.

Management and support staff
For the 2023 season.

Manager history

Record as J.League member

Attendance

Financials

Revenue & Expenditure

Assets & Net Worth

Honours

As both Sumitomo Metal FC (1947–1991) and Kashima Antlers (1991–present)National
LeagueJ1 LeagueChampions (8): 1996, 1998, 2000, 2001, 2007, 2008, 2009, 2016JSL Division 2Champions (2): 1984, 1986–87
CupsEmperor's CupWinners (5): 1997, 2000, 2007, 2010, 2016J.League CupWinners (6): 1997, 2000, 2002, 2011, 2012, 2015Japanese Super CupWinners (6): 1997, 1998, 1999, 2009, 2010, 2017All Japan Senior Football ChampionshipWinners (1): 1973
InternationalAFC Champions LeagueWinners (1): 2018A3 Champions CupWinners (1): 2003Suruga Bank ChampionshipWinners (2): 2012, 2013

Personnel awardsJ.League Player of the Year Jorginho (1996)
 Marquinhos (2008)
 Mitsuo Ogasawara (2009)J.League Top Scorer Marquinhos (2008)J.League Best Eleven Santos (1993)
 Shunzo Ono (1993)
 Yasuto Honda (1993)
 Naoki Soma (1995, 1996, 1997, 1998)
 Jorginho (1996)
 Bismarck (1997)
 Yutaka Akita (1997, 1998, 2000)
 Atsushi Yanagisawa (1998, 2001)
 Daijiro Takakuwa (2000)
 Akira Narahashi (2001)
 Mitsuo Ogasawara (2001, 2002, 2003, 2004, 2005, 2009)
 Kōji Nakata (2001)
 Hitoshi Sogahata (2002)
 Daiki Iwamasa (2007, 2008, 2009)
 Marquinhos (2008)
 Atsuto Uchida (2008, 2009)
 Yuya Osako (2013)
 Gaku Shibasaki (2014)
 Mu Kanazaki (2015)
 Gen Shoji (2016, 2017)
 Daigo Nishi (2017, 2018)
 Everaldo (2020)J.League Rookie of the Year Atsushi Yanagisawa (1997)
 Gaku Shibasaki (2012)
 Caio (2014)
 Ryotaro Araki (2021)J.League Manager of the Year'''
 João Carlos (1997)
 Oswaldo de Oliveira (2007, 2008, 2009)
 Masatada Ishii (2016)

World Cup players
The following players have been selected by their country in the World Cup, while playing for Kashima Antlers:
 Akira Narahashi (1998, 2002)
 Naoki Soma (1998)
 Yutaka Akita (1998)
 Atsushi Yanagisawa (2002, 2006)
 Hitoshi Sogahata (2002)
 Kōji Nakata (2002)
 Mitsuo Ogasawara (2002, 2006)
 Takayuki Suzuki (2002)
 Atsuto Uchida (2010)
 Daiki Iwamasa (2010)
 Lee Jung-soo  (2010)
 Gen Shoji (2018)
 Naomichi Ueda (2018)

Olympic players
The following players have represented their country at the Summer Olympic Games whilst playing for Kashima Antlers:
 Atsushi Yanagisawa (2000)
 Kōji Nakata (2000)
 Masashi Motoyama (2000)
 Tomoyuki Hirase (2000)
 Hitoshi Sogahata (2004)
 Atsuto Uchida  (2008)
 Kazuya Yamamura  (2012)
 Naomichi Ueda  (2016)
 Ayase Ueda  (2020)
 Koki Machida  (2020)

Former players

International capped players

In popular culture
In the Captain Tsubasa'' manga series, two characters were players of Kashima Antlers. The Brazilian midfielders Luciano Leo (himself loosely based on Leonardo) and Pepe were colleagues of Flamengo's Carlos Santana and São Paulo FC's Tsubasa Ozora.

Notes

References

External links
 Official Website 
 Official Website 

 
J.League clubs
Japan Soccer League clubs
Football clubs in Japan
Association football clubs established in 1947
Kashima, Ibaraki
Emperor's Cup winners
Japanese League Cup winners
Mitsui
Sports teams in Ibaraki Prefecture
1947 establishments in Japan
AFC Champions League winning clubs